Industrialna is a station on the Kyiv Light Rail in Ukraine It was opened in 1977.

History
On October 12 2008 section Politekhnichna - Ivana Lepse was closed for reconstruction.

On October 16, 2010, the station was opened for several hours, but then closed again due to unpreparedness of the underpass. Reopened to passengers on October 24, 2010. After opening, repair works continued at the station, and by December 2010, cover was installed over the platforms and entrances to the underpasses.

References

External links
 

Kyiv Light Rail stations